The 2000–01 Israeli Women's Cup (Gvia HaMedina Nashim) was the 3rd season of Israel's women's nationwide football cup competition.

The competition was won by Hapoel Tel Aviv who had beaten Maccabi Haifa 4–3 in the final.

Results

First round

Quarter-finals

Semi-finals

Final

References
2000–2001 Israeli Women's Cup Results Women's Football in Israel (via Internet Archive) 

Israel Women's Cup seasons
Cup
Israel